is a mountain located on the border between Ashibetsu and Furano, Hokkaidō, Japan. It is part of the Yūbari Mountains.

References

External links
 Mt. Ashibetsudake, at 北海道の旅, (in Japanese)

Ashibetsu